Serghei Pogreban (born 13 May 1978) is a Moldovan football forward currently unattached after end of contract with FK Ekranas.

Pogreban made 13 appearances for the Moldova national football team from 2001 to 2004.

References

1978 births
Living people
Moldovan footballers
Moldova international footballers
Moldovan Super Liga players
A Lyga players
FC Tiraspol players
FK Ekranas players
FC Zhetysu players
Association football forwards
Moldovan expatriate footballers
Expatriate footballers in Lithuania
Expatriate footballers in Kazakhstan